Murolo is an Italian surname. Notable people with the surname include:

Michele Murolo (born 1983), Italian footballer
Roberto Murolo (1912–2003), Italian musician

See also
Murilo (disambiguation)

Italian-language surnames